The national debt of Turkey is the entire stock of direct, fixed-term, contractual, financial  obligations of the state of the Republic of Turkey that are outstanding on a particular date.

Domestic debt
At the end of 2017, the total, gross state-debt of Turkey stood at approximately TL954 bn (appr. $221 bn), equivalent to about 30% of GDP. After deducting the net assets of the Central Bank of Turkey, public-sector deposits, and the net assets of the unemployment insurance funds, the total, net state-debt of Turkey stood at approx. TL262 bn (approx. $60 bn), representing 8% of GDP.

Foreign debt
At the end of December 2017, the gross, foreign-currency denominated debt of the Turkish state stood at $453.2 bn (about 53% of GDP), while Turkey's net foreign debt was $291.2 bn (about 34% of GDP). Loans guaranteed by the Turkish Treasury stood at $13.8 billion during the same period.

In February 2018, the country's foreign-currency reserves stood at the equivalent of $114.5 bn.

Concerns
While some analysts, in the recent past, have dismissed concerns about Turkey's "debt problem" as "alarmist" and based on "fallacies," in March 2018, citing concerns about the country's large, external-financing needs and a "deteriorating political climate", financial analysts Moody's downgraded Turkey's debt to Ba2 from Ba1, with "a stable outlook." Their report suggested the "possibility of a sudden, disruptive reversal in foreign capital inflows, a more rapid fall in already inadequate [foreign exchange] reserves and, in a worst-case scenario, a balance of payments crisis."

In April 2018, the Turkish Industry and Business Association chairman stated that the country "should leave the course of economic growth based on consumption and foreign loans," recalling that Turkey's foreign debt stock "now exceeds 53% of its GNP."

Turkey's Deputy Prime Minister Mehmet Simsek stated that the national currency's "depreciation has made the economy [more] competitive, and that "the worst for the Turkish Lira is now over." Analysts warned of a "systemic risk" on account of the weakening of the Lira against the U.S. Dollar and the Euro, and the growing amount of corporate, foreign-currency debt, which has "more than doubled since 2009."

Financial markets
As of 2018, Turkey's bond market, trading in the local currency, is the 6th largest among emerging market countries. At the end of 2009, the corporate-bond market in Turkey amounted to TL481 million (US$340million), going up to TL1.4 billion5 (US$1.9 billion) by 2010 and to TL4.3 billion at the end of 2011. By 2017, the market totaled approximately TL18 bn ($5.2 bn), although a series of corporate defaults and restructurings has somewhat "dampened investor appetite."

The average coupon rate on corporate debt issued between 2015 and 2017 was 12.1%, compared with 11.1% on short-term deposits and 10.4% for 2-year government bonds.

The Turkish Eurobond market opened in early 2011, and banks and corporate entities were allowed to issue Eurobonds directly, without paying withholding taxes on interest payments under the bonds.

See also
Economy of Turkey
Ottoman public debt
Banks Association of Turkey
Turkish currency and debt crisis, 2018

Notes

References

External links
Turkey fact sheet, OECD, 2017

Turkey
Finance in Turkey